The Max Planck Institute for Mathematics in the Sciences (MPI 
MiS) in Leipzig is a research institute of the Max Planck Society. Founded on March 1, 1996, the institute works on projects which apply mathematics in various areas of natural sciences, in particular physics, biology, chemistry and material science.

Research groups 

Nonlinear algebra (Bernd Sturmfels),
Pattern formation, energy landscapes and scaling laws (Felix Otto),
Riemannian, Kählerian and algebraic geometry, and neuronal networks (Jürgen Jost),
Information Theory of Cognitive Systems (Nihat Ay)
Stochastic partial differential equations (Benjamin Gess)
Mathematical Software (Michael Joswig)
Combinatorial Algebraic Geometry (Mateusz Michałek)
Deep Learning Theory (Guido Montúfar)
Rigidity and Flexibility in PDEs (Angkana Rüland)
Structure of Evolution (Matteo Smerlak)
Tensors and Optimization (André Uschmajew)

The institute has an extensive visitors programme which has made Leipzig a main place for research in applied mathematics.

The MPI MiS is a member of ERCOM (European Research Centres in Mathematics).

External links 
 Homepage of the institute

Mathematical institutes
Mathematics in the Sciences